Tapie is a surname. Notable people with the surname include:

 Bernard Tapie (1943–2021), French businessman and politician
 Georges Tapie (1910–1964), French rower
 Michel Tapié (1909–1987), French art critic, curator and collector